Thermometer is a 2019 Burmese comedy television series. It aired on MRTV-4, from January 21 to February 15, 2019, on Mondays to Fridays at 20:45 for 20 episodes.

Cast
Phone Sett Thwin as Thermometer
Khay Sett Thwin as Phoo Phoo, Wutt Hlwar Phoo Ngone
So Pyay Myint as Aung Yu Pa
Ayeyar as Ayeyarwin
Kin Kaung as Kin Stine

References

Burmese television series
MRTV (TV network) original programming